General Hobbs may refer to:

Leland Hobbs (1892–1966), U.S. Army major general
Michael Hobbs (British Army officer) (born 1937), British Army major general
Reginald Hobbs (1908–1977), British Army major general
Talbot Hobbs (1864–1938), Australian Army lieutenant general